Mehedi Hassan Tapu  is a Bangladeshi footballer who plays as a centre forward. He last played for Team BJMC in Bangladesh Premier League, before the club was defunct in 2019. He scored his first international goal against Palestine during 2006 AFC Challenge Cup.

References

Living people
1984 births
Footballers from Dhaka
Bangladeshi footballers
Bangladesh Football Premier League players
Bangladesh international footballers
Association football forwards
Mohammedan SC (Dhaka) players
Brothers Union players
Abahani Limited (Dhaka) players
Team BJMC players
People from Narayanganj District